Ross Lupaschuk (born January 19, 1981) is a Canadian ice hockey defenceman.

Juniors
Lupaschuk played his junior-level hockey in the Western Hockey League (WHL) for five seasons with the Lethbridge Hurricanes, Prince Albert Raiders and Red Deer Rebels. He was traded from the Raiders to the Rebels in 2001 in time to play for the Rebels during their 2001 Memorial Cup win. While with the Raiders, he was selected in the 1999 NHL Entry Draft by the Washington Capitals in the second round, 34th overall. Before turning professional, his playing rights were traded to the Pittsburgh Penguins.

NHL and AHL
Lupaschuk played four seasons in the Penguins organization, primarily for the Wilkes-Barre/Scranton Penguins of the American Hockey League, except for three games with the Pittsburgh Penguins in 2002–03. He attended Phoenix Coyotes training camp at the start of the 2009–10 season, but was released on September 20, 2009.

Europe and Russia
As a restricted free agent in 2005, Lupaschuk elected not to re-sign with the Penguins for the upcoming season and instead opted for Mora IK, in Sweden. The following year he played for Malmö Redhawks, also in Sweden, but left the team during the season for Kärpät, in Finland. In 2007, he transferred to Avangard Omsk Oblast of the Russian league. In 2008, he joined the HC Sibir Novosibirsk of the Kontinental Hockey League after a tryout with the Anaheim Ducks, played there until 19 January 2009 and signed on 22 January 2009 by Mora IK.

On November 3, 2009, Lupaschuk signed a contract to play with HIFK for the remainder of the season.

Awards and records
 WHL East Second All-Star Team (2000–01)
 Memorial Cup Champion (2000–01)
 Memorial Cup Tournament All-Star Team (2000–01)
 Named to CHL All-Star 2nd team (2000–01)
 SM-Liiga Kanada-Malja Champion (2006–07)

Transactions
 November 19, 1999 - Traded to Red Deer (WHL) by Prince Albert (WHL) with Craig Brunel for Brent Hobday, Steven MacIntyre, Regan Darby and Scott McQueen.
 July 11, 2001 - Traded from Washington Capitals (NHL) with Kris Beech and Michal Sivek to Pittsburgh Penguins (NHL) for Jaromír Jágr and Frantisek Kucera.
 October 2, 2001 - Assigned to Wilkes-Barre/Scranton (AHL)
 October 5, 2002 - Assigned to Wilkes-Barre/Scranton (AHL)
 September 30, 2003 - Assigned to Wilkes-Barre/Scranton (AHL)
 August 3, 2004 - Re-signed by the Pittsburgh Penguins to a one-year contract.
 May 31, 2005 - Signed with the Mora IK of the Elitserein (Sweden).
 July 30, 2006 - Signed as a free agent by Malmö Red Hawks (Sweden).
 November 8, 2006 - Signed as a free agent by Kärpät (Finland).
 July 20, 2007 - Signed as a free agent by Avangard Omsk (Russia).
 September 17, 2008 - Invited to training camp by the Anaheim Ducks
 September 29, 2008 - Assigned to Iowa Chops (AHL)
 October 13, 2008 - Signed as a free agent by Avangard Omsk (KHL)
 October 13, 2008 - Transferred to Sibir Novosibirsk (KHL)
 September 11, 2009 - Invited to training camp by the Phoenix Coyotes.
 September 20, 2009 - Released from training camp by the Phoenix Coyotes.
 November 3, 2009 - Signed as a free agent by HIFK (Finland).
 July 23, 2010 - Signed as a free agent by the Cologne Sharks (Germany).

Career statistics

References

External links
 

1981 births
Avangard Omsk players
Canadian expatriate ice hockey players in Sweden
Canadian ice hockey defencemen
EC Red Bull Salzburg players
Canadian expatriate ice hockey players in Russia
HC Sibir Novosibirsk players
HIFK (ice hockey) players
Jokerit players
Kölner Haie players
Lethbridge Hurricanes players
Living people
Malmö Redhawks players
Mora IK players
Oulun Kärpät players
Pittsburgh Penguins players
Prince Albert Raiders players
Red Deer Rebels players
Ice hockey people from Edmonton
Washington Capitals draft picks
Wilkes-Barre/Scranton Penguins players